The African-American diaspora refers to communities of people outside of the United States who are descended from people of African descent who were enslaved in the United States or its preceding European colonies along the east coast of North America.

West Africa

Sierra Leone
Many freed slaves were discontent with where they were resettled in Canada after the Revolutionary War and were eager to return to their homeland. Beginning in 1787, the British government made their first attempt to settle people in Sierra Leone. About 300 Black Britons, known as the Black Poor of London, were settled on the Sierra Leonean peninsula in West Africa. Within two years, most members of the settlement would die from disease or conflict with the local Temne people. In 1792, a second attempt at settlement was made when 1,100 freed slaves established Freetown with support from British abolitionist Thomas Clarkson. Their numbers were further bolstered when over 500 Jamaican Maroons were transported first to Nova Scotia, and then to Sierra Leone in 1800. The descendants of the freedmen in Freetown are the Sierra Leone Creole people.

Liberia
In the early 19th century, the American Colonization Society was established with the stated aim of sending formerly enslaved African-Americans back to Africa. There, they would establish independent colonies on the West African coast. Gaining support from both American slaveowners and abolitionists, in the 1840s ships containing both African Americans and Black West Indian settlers landed on the West African coast and established the nation of Liberia. There, they formed the Americo-Liberian ethnic group in contrast to the indigenous Africans who lived in Liberia.

Canada

African-Americans who settled in Canada before Confederation include three major waves:
 Black Loyalists who crossed to British lines and fought for the British during the American Revolutionary War
 Another wave of ex-slaves who joined the British in order to gain freedom during the War of 1812
 Tens of thousands of slaves who fled for freedom through the Underground Railroad between 1820 and 1865.

Other, smaller waves of African-American settlement occurred in Western Canada in the 19th and early 20th centuries, with African-Americans from California taking up an allowance from the Colony of Vancouver Island to settle on the island in the 1860s, as well as settlements by African-Americans from Oklahoma and Texas in Amber Valley,  Campsie, Junkins (now Wildwood) and Keystone (now Breton) in Alberta, as well as a former community in the Rural Municipality of Eldon, north of Maidstone, Saskatchewan.

Caribbean

Mexico

Europe

In the 1780s with the end of the American Revolutionary War, hundreds of black loyalists, especially soldiers, from America were resettled in London. However, they were never awarded pensions, and many of them became poverty-stricken and were reduced to begging on the streets. Reports at the time stated they: ''had no prospect of subsisting in this country but by depredations on the public, or by common charity.'' A sympathetic observer wrote that ''great numbers of Blacks and People of Colour, many of them refugees from America and others who have by land or sea been in his Majesty's service were.....in great distress.'' Even towards white loyalists there was little good will to new arrivals from America. Later some, many of whom had fallen into poverty, emigrated to Sierra Leone with help from Committee for the Relief of the Black Poor.

The African-American population in Britain did not grow until World War II. By the end of 1943 there were 3,312 African-American GIs based at Maghull and Huyton, near Liverpool.

Israel

See also
Emigration from the United States
African diaspora

References